Charles Rodney Chandler (Arcadia, July 23, 1938 – São Paulo, October 12, 1968) was a US Army officer and veteran of the Vietnam War assassinated by members of the  (VPR) and the Ação Libertadora Nacional (ALN) in São Paulo, Brazil.

Assassination 
On an October morning in 1968, Chandler entered his Chevrolet Impala, backed out of the garage, and was blocked by a Volkswagen Beetle from entering the road. Diógenes José Carvalho de Oliveira unloaded the six rounds of his Taurus .38 caliber revolver on Chandler, then Marquito opened fire on the American veteran with a machine gun.

According to the report prepared by the Department of Political and Social Order (DOPS), or Brazilian political police, organizations resisting the US-backed military dictatorship in Brazil considered him to be a spy of the Central Intelligence Agency (CIA). According to US state sources, he was in Brazil to study Portuguese

The assassins dropped pamphlets with the text:

Legacy 
The historian  characterizes the assassination of Chandler as having had a major impact on the Brazilian military regime, as he was a "North American captain, with such an aura."

Involvement in the planning of the assassination is among the baseless accusations supporters of Jair Bolsonaro spread about Dilma Rousseff.

In popular culture 
The assassination of Charles Rodney Chandler was portrayed in Wagner Moura's 2019 film Marighella.

Notes

References 

American military personnel
People of the Vietnam War
1968 deaths
1938 births
Assassinations in Brazil
1968 in Brazil